Verena Esther Huber-Dyson (May 6, 1923 – March 12, 2016) was a Swiss-American mathematician, known for her work on group theory and formal logic. She has been described as a "brilliant mathematician", and did research on the interface between algebra and logic, focusing on undecidability in group theory. At the time of her death, she was emeritus faculty in the philosophy department of the University of Calgary, Alberta.

Life and career

Family and early life 
Huber-Dyson was born Verena Esther Huber in Naples, Italy, on May 6, 1923. Her parents, Karl (Charles) Huber (1893–1946) and Berthy Ryffel (1899–1945), were Swiss nationals who raised Verena and her sister Adelheid ("Heidi", 1925–1987) in Athens, Greece, where the girls attended the German-speaking Deutsche Schule, or German School of Athens, until forced to return to Switzerland in 1940 by the war.

Charles Huber, who had managed the Middle Eastern operations of Bühler AG, a Swiss food-process engineering firm, began working for the International Committee of the Red Cross (ICRC), monitoring the treatment of prisoners of war in internment camps. As the ICRC delegate to India and Ceylon, he was responsible for Italian prisoners held in British camps, but also visited German and Allied camps in Europe, and in 1945-46 served as an ICRC delegate to the United States, which he described to Verena as a place she "definitely ought to experience at length and in depth but just as definitely ought not to settle in."

She studied mathematics, with minors in physics and philosophy, at the University of Zurich, where she obtained her Ph.D. in mathematics in 1947 with a thesis in finite group theory. under the supervision of Andreas Speiser.

Children 

Verena married Hans-Georg Haefeli, a fellow mathematician, in 1942, and was divorced in 1948. Her first daughter, Katarina Halm (née Halm), was born in 1945.

She subsequently married Freeman Dyson in Ann Arbor, Michigan, on August 11, 1950. They had two children together, Esther Dyson (born July 14, 1951, in Zurich) and George Dyson (born 1953, Ithaca, New York), and divorced in 1958.

Career 
Huber-Dyson accepted a postdoctoral fellow appointment at the Institute for Advanced Study in Princeton in 1948, where she worked on group theory and formal logic. She also began teaching at Goucher College near Baltimore during this time.

She moved to California with her daughter Katarina, began teaching at San Jose State University in 1959, and then joined Alfred Tarski's Group in Logic and the Methodology of Science at the University of California, Berkeley.

Huber-Dyson taught at San Jose State University, the University of Zürich, Monash University, as well as at University of California, Berkeley, Adelphi University, University of California, Los Angeles, and the University of Illinois at Chicago, in mathematics and in philosophy departments.  She accepted a position in the philosophy department of the University of Calgary in 1973, becoming emerita in 1988.

Academic affiliations prior to June 1968 

 Cornell University
 Goucher College
 San Jose State University (September 1959)
 Adelphi University
 UCLA
 University of London
 ETH Zürich
 Warwick University
 University of Melbourne
 Monash University
 Australian National University in Canberra
 University of Zürich
 Mills College
 UC Berkeley

Academic affiliations after September 1968 
 Department of Mathematics, University of Illinois at Chicago (September 1968 – June 1971) tenure-track Assistant Professor
 Department of Philosophy, University of Calgary (September 1971 –June 1972) nontenure-track
 Department of Mathematics, University of Illinois at Chicago (September 1972 – June 1973) tenured Associate Professor
 Department of Philosophy, University of Calgary (September 1973 – June 1975) tenure-track Assistant Professor
 Department of Philosophy, University of Calgary (September 1977 – June 1981) tenured Associate Professor.
 Department of Philosophy, University of Calgary (September 1981 – June 1988) Full Professor
 Department of Philosophy, University of Calgary (September 1988 – March 2016) Emerita Professor

Activities while at Calgary 
 Taught graduate courses on foundations of mathematics and the philosophy and methodology of the sciences
 Began work on the monograph, Gödel's theorems: a workbook on formalization

Non-academic employment 
 Consultant for Remington Rand (Univac) in Philadelphia
 Consultant for Hughes Aircraft in Los Angeles

Later life 

After retiring from Calgary, Verena Huber-Dyson moved back to South Pender Island in British Columbia, where she lived for 14 years. She died on March 12, 2016, in Bellingham, Washington, at the age of 92.

Selected publications

Monographs

Articles

References

Notes

Citations

Sources

 

 

1923 births
2016 deaths
Swiss expatriates in Canada
Swiss emigrants to the United States
Goucher College faculty and staff
Institute for Advanced Study visiting scholars
Mathematical logicians
Women logicians
Academic staff of the University of Calgary
University of California, Berkeley faculty
University of Zurich alumni
Women mathematicians
Swiss mathematicians